Alan David Hansen (born 13 June 1955) is a Scottish former footballer and BBC television football pundit. He played as a central defender for Partick Thistle, for the successful Liverpool team of the late 1970s and 1980s, and for the Scotland national team. Hansen is widely regarded as one of the greatest Liverpool defenders of all time. As a football pundit, Hansen became known for his outspoken views, particularly on teams' defensive performances, frequently criticising what he believed was "diabolical" or "shocking" defending. He co-hosted Match of the Day from 1992 to 2014.

Early life
Hansen was born in Sauchie, Clackmannanshire, Scotland, and attended Lornshill Academy and supported Rangers growing up. His paternal grandfather was Danish. Hansen played his early football (along with his older brother John, a one-club player) at Scottish Junior league club, Sauchie Juniors near Alloa.

At the age of 15, Hansen ran into a plate-glass panel after playing volleyball and was left with a large scar on his forehead. The glass was in a brand-new youth club which Hansen attended. During his two-hour hospital stay he had 27 stitches in his head. He sued the education authority and won the case. Hansen stopped playing football between the ages of 15 and 17 and concentrated on playing golf, with aspirations of becoming a professional. His father and brother wanted Hansen to play football, so he accepted the offer of a trial with Hibernian when he was 17. Hibernian manager Eddie Turnbull offered Hansen a professional contract, but he refused because it would have stopped him from playing golf competitively.

Club career

Partick Thistle
Hansen turned down the opportunity to study at the University of Aberdeen, in order to join his older brother John at Partick Thistle. During the summer while his application was being processed, he worked for six weeks in the offices of General Accident insurance — which he hated. As a trainee, Hansen attended the 1971 Scottish League Cup Final, seeing a Partick Thistle side that included his brother John create one of the biggest shocks ever in Scottish football by defeating favourites Celtic 4–1 at Hampden Park.

After breaking into the first team at Thistle, Hansen was watched by top clubs, including Bob Paisley's Liverpool. In 1975–76 season Hansen played 21 times as Thistle won the Scottish First Division championship to gain entry into the Scottish Premier Division. By the end of the following season Hansen had 35 first team appearances, before moving south of the border to Liverpool on 5 May 1977. After arriving at Anfield, the nickname which he loathed for years ("Stretch") was forgotten and a new nickname "Jockey" was born.

Liverpool
Hansen cost Liverpool £100,000. He made his debut on 24 September 1977 in a league match at Anfield. Derby County were the visitors and were beaten by a single goal scored by Terry McDermott. Hansen hit his first goal the following month on 19 October during a European Cup 2nd round 1st leg tie at Anfield. He opened the scoring in the 14th minute as Liverpool demolished East German side Dynamo Dresden 5–1.

Hansen was put into the first team sporadically throughout the season. He was not in the side which lost the 1978 League Cup final replay to Nottingham Forest, but he was selected for the Liverpool side which won the 1978 European Cup Final 1–0 over FC Bruges at Wembley, on a goal by Kenny Dalglish. Hansen managed 18 appearances in the First Division that season, where Liverpool finished runners-up to Nottingham Forest.

In the following season, 1978–79, Hansen was a regular in the team as Liverpool regained the league title. The team's final points tally of 68 was a record under the two points for a win system, and they conceded only four goals at home at Anfield. When long-serving club captain Emlyn Hughes was sold to Wolves, Hansen became an automatic first-choice central defender in the team, and Liverpool's domination of English club football continued in the 1979–80 season with another league title.

In the 1980–81 season, Liverpool won two trophies, but did not win a third consecutive league title as Aston Villa finished as English champions. Liverpool won their first League Cup in 1981, defeating West Ham United 2–1 in a replay at Villa Park. Hansen also won his second European Cup winners medal in 1981, Liverpool defeating Real Madrid 1–0 at the Parc des Princes in Paris on 27 May.

The league title returned to Anfield in the 1981–82 season, and Liverpool also retained the League Cup in 1982 with a 3–1 win over Tottenham Hotspur, although Hansen missed this victory with injury. Liverpool did not retain the European Cup in 1982, surprisingly losing in the quarter-final to CSKA Sofia 2–1 on aggregate.

In the 1982–83 season, Liverpool once again took the league title and held on to the League Cup in 1983, defeating Manchester United 2–1 after extra-time in the final at Wembley. Bob Paisley, who signed Hansen for Liverpool in 1977, retired at the end of the 1982–83 season and was replaced as manager by long-serving coach Joe Fagan.

In the 1983–84 season, Liverpool completed a treble of trophies in Fagan's first season as manager, winning the league title, League Cup and European Cup. Hansen was involved in a controversial incident in the League Cup final at Wembley when he appeared to handle a shot on the goal line. Despite protests from opponents and Merseyside rivals Everton, no penalty was given. Liverpool won the final after a replay at Maine Road.

Liverpool reached the 1984 European Cup final after beating Romanian champions Dinamo Bucharest 3–1 on aggregate in the semi-final. The first leg at Anfield was an ill-tempered affair with Liverpool captain Graeme Souness breaking the jaw of a Bucharest midfielder. Hansen played in the European Cup final victory over A.S. Roma, which Liverpool won on a penalty shoot-out after the match ended 1–1 in front of a crowd of 69,000 at Roma's home stadium, the Stadio Olimpico.

Liverpool did not win a trophy in the 1984–85 season and were banned from all European competition after the 1985 European Cup Final which pitted Liverpool against the Italian giants Juventus at Heysel was preceded by rioting which caused the deaths of 39 people, including 32 Italian Juventus fans. Liverpool lost the match 1–0. Hansen would never play in a European tie again.

Manager Joe Fagan retired after the Heysel disaster, and Hansen's friend, teammate and fellow Scotsman Kenny Dalglish was appointed as player-manager. He gave Hansen the captaincy and the season ended in triumph, as in 1986 Liverpool became only the third side in the 20th century to complete a League and FA Cup "double", following Tottenham in 1961 and Arsenal in 1971. Hansen lifted both trophies as captain and earned his first FA Cup winners' medal, thereby completing the domestic set.

Liverpool failed to win a trophy in the 1986–87 season, losing the League Cup final at Wembley when Arsenal defeated them 2–1, while Merseyside rivals Everton took the league title. In the 1987–88 season they lost just twice in the league winning the title with Hansen as skipper. Liverpool also reached the FA Cup final, but were denied a second "double" when they were beaten 1–0 by Wimbledon in one of the competition's biggest shocks. Two days later, 31,000 attended Anfield for Hansen's testimonial match against an England XI preparing for UEFA Euro 1988.

Hansen was restricted to just six league appearances in the 1988–89 season as a result of a dislocated left knee sustained in a pre-season friendly against Atlético Madrid in Spain. Hansen played in the 1989 FA Cup final at Wembley, which Liverpool won 3–2 in extra-time against Everton, though Hansen did not lift the trophy as captain. The honour was given to teammate Ronnie Whelan who had deputised in Hansen's absence through injury and retained the role even after the club's first choice captain was fit again. Hansen did not have any objections to Whelan keeping the captaincy that season.

After winning the 1989 FA Cup, Liverpool were denied a second "double" in four seasons when they lost the League title to Arsenal on 26 May 1989. Michael Thomas scored a crucial last minute goal for Arsenal at Anfield that gave the North Londoners a 2–0 win. This resulted in Arsenal winning the league title on goals scored after the two teams had finished the season with the same number of points and exactly the same goal difference.

Hansen made more appearances the following season but his persistent knee problems continued to affect his fitness although he still captained Liverpool to another League title, which made it eight individually for Hansen, which was a record at the time. The club came close to the "double" yet again, but lost an FA Cup semi-final 4–3 in extra-time to Crystal Palace at Villa Park.

Hansen was unable to play in any competitive games during the 1990–91 season (when Liverpool finished second in the league and were trophyless for only the third time since Hansen's arrival 14 years earlier) and he retired in March 1991, a month after Kenny Dalglish resigned as manager. At this stage Ronnie Moran was caretaker manager until the appointment of Graeme Souness in the permanent position shortly afterwards.

In Hansen's playing career for Liverpool, his winners medals include 8 league titles, 3 European Cups, 2 FA Cups and 4 League Cups.

Hillsborough disaster
On 15 April 1989, the Hillsborough disaster claimed the lives of 94 Liverpool fans (eventually rising to 97). Hansen was selected for the FA Cup semi-final match against Nottingham Forest at Hillsborough, playing the opening six minutes of the match before it was abandoned. Hansen attended 12 funerals and visited the injured in hospital.

In his autobiography, Hansen described the tragedy as "the blackest period of my life". He wrote: "The number of broken hearts was incalculable. The immediate aftermath, when Kenny Dalglish and the players attended the funerals and tried to show support for the grieving families took more out of me emotionally than any other experience I have gone through." On Match of the Day in April 2009, Hansen spoke emotionally about the tragedy. He said: "It was a horrific time, traumatic for everybody. It must never be forgotten." In 2010, Hansen said that each of the funerals that he attended after Hillsborough got harder. "The emotional scars will be there forever,” he said.

In an article in The Daily Telegraph, Hansen responded to the Hillsborough Independent Panel report of September 2012, by writing: "I have encountered ignorance about Hillsborough on many occasions, finding myself having to correct the inaccurate version of events. The report explicitly removes the excuse of ignorance for those who misunderstood the tragedy. Each sentence in it reads as a tribute to the honesty, integrity and dignity of the families and is an acknowledgement of everything they have been saying since those first, scurrilous accusations surfaced."

International career
Having previously appeared for the under-23 side, Hansen made his full debut for Scotland on 19 May 1979 in a British Home Championship match against Wales in front of 20,000 spectators at Ninian Park, Cardiff. Scotland manager Jock Stein gave debuts to four Scottish players that day – George Burley, John Wark, Paul Hegarty and Hansen. Hosts Wales won the match 3–0 against a somewhat inexperienced Scottish line-up, with striker John Toshack scoring a hat-trick for Wales.

Hansen's second Scotland cap came the following month on 2 June 1979 in a prestigious Saturday afternoon friendly match at Glasgow's Hampden Park against reigning World Champions Argentina. On the hottest day in Glasgow for 30 years, the 61,000 sun-drenched crowd at Hampden Park saw the South Americans beat Scotland 3–1, with an 18-year-old Diego Maradona scoring his first international goal for Argentina in a virtuoso display of skill and trickery. In an interview in 2007, Hansen said that Maradona was "without a shadow of a doubt the best player I came up against. He was virtually unplayable – even at 18."

Hansen played for Scotland in the 1982 World Cup in Spain. The team failed to progress beyond the qualifying group, having drawn 2–2 with the USSR when Scotland needed a win to progress in the tournament. An accidental collision between Hansen and central defensive partner Willie Miller allowed USSR striker Ramaz Shengelia through to score the Soviets' second goal.

A formidable Scotland central defensive partnership was formed between Willie Miller and Alex McLeish of Aberdeen, who were managed by Alex Ferguson. Ferguson, who took charge of the national team after the sudden death of Jock Stein, dropped Hansen from the squad for the 1986 World Cup in Mexico. Hansen disagreed with the decision, as he felt that his form in the 1985–86 season (when Liverpool had won a league and cup double) was near his best. Hansen had played infrequently for Scotland before the tournament, and had often withdrawn from squads. Hansen won the last of his 26 Scotland caps in 1987.

Management offers
Hansen was offered the Huddersfield Town job in 1992, following the sacking of Eoin Hand, but he turned it down. There were strong rumours that Hansen would be approached to take over as manager of Liverpool after his former captain Graeme Souness was sacked by the club in 1994. Hansen ruled himself out by stating that, despite his great affection for the club, he simply was not interested in coaching or management; a position he has maintained ever since Roy Evans got the job. Hansen also turned down an offer in 1995 to manage Manchester City, following the sacking of Brian Horton.

Media career

After rejecting the idea of management, when he retired from football in 1991 he planned to take three months off. After his wife pointed out that nobody had contacted them during his rest period, he started calling the networks. Sky Television employed Hansen as a pundit and summariser almost as soon as he ceased playing, and soon he had established enough of a reputation as a considered observer and thinker within the game for the BBC to approach him. He began working for BBC Radio 5 Live, before moving on to Match of the Day. Hansen was employed for 22 years as the main pundit for the BBC's football coverage (rights to show matches or highlights permitting) and was known as a calm, authoritative, and rational analyst of the game who is particularly keen on highlighting the triumphs and "shocking", "poor" or "diabolical" mistakes of defenders and commenting on "mediocre" performances. He became a columnist for  The Daily Telegraph, Telegraph.co.uk and the BBC Sport website on football issues and has also worked as a motivational speaker.

Hansen is known for coining the phrase "you can't win anything with kids", having made the remark following Manchester United's 3–1 defeat to Aston Villa on the opening day of the 1995–96 FA Premier League season. After selling three high-profile players (Paul Ince, Mark Hughes, and Andrei Kanchelskis) in the summer of 1995, United had introduced youth team players Paul Scholes, David Beckham, Nicky Butt and Gary Neville into the first team. United proved Hansen wrong by winning a league and cup double that season. Hansen still continues to this day to repeat this phrase for humorous effect. He later said that the phrase "made him" as a pundit, as people would shout it at him in public places.

Commentating on the Argentina–Romania match in the 1994 FIFA World Cup, Hansen said that "the Argentine defender warrants shooting for a mistake like that". The previous day, Colombian defender Andrés Escobar had been shot dead, a killing widely attributed to punishment for an own goal Escobar scored in Colombia's 2–1 loss to the United States earlier in the same tournament. The BBC issued a public apology for Hansen's poor choice of words.

During an appearance on Match of the Day on 21 December 2011, while discussing the prominence of racism in English football following allegations against Premier League players Luis Suárez and John Terry, Hansen caused controversy after twice using the word "coloured" in reference to black footballers. The BBC received 82 complaints by the following morning while some, including Shamrock Rovers player Rohan Ricketts, criticised Hansen's choice of words on social network Twitter. Ricketts tweeted: "He is part of the problem when using that word. We are BLACK Alan!". Others defended his use of words. The Daily Telegraph blogger and commentator Toby Young wrote: "In his defence, Hansen could cite the fact that America's foremost civil rights group is the NAACP which stands for the National Association for the Advancement of Colored People. If it's acceptable for the NAACP to use the word "coloured", why isn't it acceptable for him?" Hansen issued an apology the following day, saying "'I unreservedly apologise for any offence caused – this was never my intention and I deeply regret the use of the word."

In May 2013, it was reported that Hansen's BBC contract was due to expire after the 2014 FIFA World Cup. On 5 September 2013, Hansen announced he would retire as a Match of the Day pundit following the 2014 World Cup. His last appearance on Match of the Day itself came on 11 May 2014, the final day of the 2013–14 English league season, with his last appearance as an analyst being for the 2014 FIFA World Cup Final two months later.

Other media work

Away from football analysis, Hansen is a keen golfer, and he is a member of Hillside Golf Club playing off a handicap of three and regularly returns to the town of his birth near Alloa in Clackmannanshire, Scotland to participate in celebrity golf tournaments in aid of various charities. He has hosted documentaries on the sport and worked at the Masters Tournament for the BBC. He has also presented programmes on the rise in status and wealth of the modern footballer and has appeared in television adverts, such as for Carlsberg and Morrisons supermarkets.

Personal life
Hansen lives in Southport with his wife Janet. They have been married since 1980, and have a son, Adam, and a daughter, Lucy.

During the 2014 Scottish independence referendum Hansen was a supporter of the Better Together campaign against Scottish independence.

Career statistics

Club

International

Honours
Partick Thistle
Scottish First Division: 1975–76

Liverpool
First Division: 1978–79, 1979–80, 1981–82, 1982–83, 1983–84, 1985–86, 1987–88, 1989–90
FA Cup: 1985–86, 1988–89
League Cup: 1980–81, 1981–82, 1982–83, 1983–84
FA Charity Shield: 1977 (shared), 1979, 1980, 1982, 1986 (shared), 1989
Football League Super Cup: 1986
European Cup: 1977–78, 1980–81, 1983–84
UEFA Super Cup: 1977

Individual
PFA First Division Team of the Year: 1981–82, 1982–83, 1983–84, 1986–87, 1987–88, 1989–90
PFA Team of the Century (1907 to 2007): 
Team of the Century (1977–1996)
Overall Team of the Century
English Football Hall of Fame: 2006
Scottish Football Hall of Fame: 2007
Football League 100 Legends

References

External links

 
 LFChistory.net player profile
 Liverpool appearances part 1 1977/79-1979-80 at Sporting-heroes.net
 Liverpool appearances part 2 1980-81-1982-83 at Sporting-heroes.net
 Liverpool appearances part 3 1983-84-1986-87 at Sporting-heroes.net
 Liverpool appearances part 3 1987-88-1989-90 at Sporting-heroes.net
 Scottish caps 1979–87 at Sporting-heroes.net
 "Alan Hansen's Telegraph column archive" Telegraph.co.uk

1955 births
Scottish association football commentators
Living people
Scottish footballers
Scotland international footballers
Scottish people of Danish descent
1982 FIFA World Cup players
Partick Thistle F.C. players
Liverpool F.C. players
Scottish Football League players
English Football League players
BBC sports presenters and reporters
Sportspeople from Clackmannanshire
English Football Hall of Fame inductees
Scottish Football Hall of Fame inductees
People educated at Lornshill Academy
Scotland under-23 international footballers
Scottish Junior Football Association players
Sauchie F.C. players
Association football central defenders
UEFA Champions League winning players
FA Cup Final players